Juan Francisco Lombardo (June 11, 1925 – May 24, 2012) was an Argentine football defender. He played a large part of his career for Argentine giants Boca Juniors and represented Argentina on 37 occasions.

Club career
Lombardo started his career with Newell's Old Boys in Rosario, in 1952 he joined Boca Juniors where he played 196 games, his only goal for Boca came in a 2–2 draw with Club Atlético Platense in 1952.

In 1960 Lombardo left Boca on a free transfer to join their hated rivals River Plate, but he only made 9 appearances for the club before retiring later that year.

Club title

International career

Lombardo made 37 appearances for Argentina, he played in 4 Copa Américas; 1955, 1956, and 2 in 1959. He also played in the 1958 FIFA World Cup.

International titles

References

1925 births
2012 deaths
Sportspeople from Mendoza, Argentina
Argentine people of Italian descent
Argentine footballers
Association football defenders
Newell's Old Boys footballers
Boca Juniors footballers
Club Atlético River Plate footballers
Argentine Primera División players
Argentina international footballers
1958 FIFA World Cup players